Yuan Shuhong (born July 1958) is a Chinese politician who served as party branch secretary of the Ministry of Justice from 2018 to 2021. He was a representative of the 19th National Congress of the Chinese Communist Party. He is a member of the 19th Central Committee of the Chinese Communist Party. He was a member of the 13th National Committee of the Chinese People's Political Consultative Conference.

Biography
Yuan was born in Shucheng County, Anhui, in July 1958. After resuming the college entrance examination in 1977, he entered Anhui University, majoring in Chinese language and literature. After graduation, he taught at the university. He joined the Chinese Communist Party (CCP) in May 1985. After graduation, he became a part-time professor at Peking University.

He joined the faculty of the Chinese Academy of Governance in 1997, and rose to become vice president in August 2003, a position at vice-ministerial level. He was promoted to be deputy director of the Legislative Affairs Office of the State Council in April 2009, concurrently holding the party branch secretary position since February 2017. In March 2018, he was appointed party branch secretary and deputy minister of Justice, but resigned for health reasons in August 2021. In September 2021, he took office as vice chairperson of the Education, Science, Health and Sports Committee of the Chinese People's Political Consultative Conference.

References

1958 births
Living people
People from Lu'an
Anhui University alumni
Peking University alumni
Academic staff of Anhui University
Academic staff of Peking University
People's Republic of China politicians from Anhui
Chinese Communist Party politicians from Anhui
Members of the 19th Central Committee of the Chinese Communist Party
Members of the 13th Chinese People's Political Consultative Conference